Clotilde Arias Chávarri Anduaga de Ferrero (20 June 1901 – 6 May 1959) was a Peruvian-American lyricist and composer.

She is best known for her composition of the song "Huiracocha", popular in Peru and sung worldwide; and for her translation of "The Star-Spangled Banner", the United States national anthem, into lyrical Spanish, commissioned by the U.S. Department of State in 1946.

Life
Arias was born in 1901 in Iquitos, Perú, on the shores of the Amazon. She spent many of her early years in Barbados, where she attended elementary school.

She began writing and composing songs during her teenage years. Arias's artistic talents in music, painting, and composing including playing for silent movies emerged early in Iquitos. She achieved scholastic and artistic recognition, with numerous honors. Her perfect pitch and exceptional ability to sight read made her a highly sought accompanist. Throughout Peruvian history, the Charango was a common instrument of their culture. While Arias focused on composing, she also mastered this instrument as a young child.

She moved to New York City in 1923 to study music. She married José Anduaga, another Peruvian artist, in 1929. They settled in Brooklyn and had a son, Roger. By the early 1940s, Arias had divorced Anduaga and moved to Manhattan with her son. In 1942, she became a naturalized U.S. citizen.

Arias mastered multitasking at a time when women commonly did not work outside the home. Throughout her life she did many different things, including working as a translator, composer, musician, journalist, copywriter, activist, educator, and of course, mother. She was sometimes all of them at the same time.

Throughout the 1930s and 1940s, Arias gained success as a composer in the male-dominated advertising industry. Her skills were in great demand, even during the Great Depression, but especially during World War II when U.S. companies tried to expand their markets in Latin America, and ad agencies drafted into the war effort helped create campaigns to develop a favorable image of the United States. She worked for advertising agencies and composed jingles  for Alkaseltzer, the Ford Motor Company and the Campbell Soup Company.

Arias composed other serious classical songs, including "Idilio Roto (Broken Idyll)," as well as songs in the popular style of the 1930s, some of which she sold door to door to help support her family. Later, she collaborated with notable composers and writers, including Marjorie Harper, Andy Razaf, Albert Gamse and Irving Caesar. Best known were her Spanish lyrics to song hits "Rum and Coca-Cola" (English lyrics by Morey Amsterdam) and "Managua Nicaragua" (English lyrics by Albert Gamse). In 1945, after the Division and Cultural Cooperation of the Department of State, along with the Music Educators National Conference, called for translations of the United States' national anthem, the "Star-Spangled Banner," to be translated into Spanish and Portuguese so that it could be read in the countries that speak those languages. It had already been translated into Spanish twice, but neither could be sung. Arias took on that task, and translated it as closely as she could into Spanish. Arias' version remains to this day the only official translation of the national anthem allowed to be sung.

Amongst her numerous compositions, "Huiracocha" may be the best known. Named for a god of the Incas, the song retells the legend of his emergence from the depths of Lake Titicaca to create the sun, moon, and stars, and to breathe life into Allcavica, ancestor of the Inca people. According to Arias's own program note, this song is "dedicated to the Indian, the Forgotten Man of the Americas".  It tells of the "sadness of a race calling to the ancient god of their forefathers, who no longer hears his children".

Tributes 
On December 9, 2006, "Huiracocha" was performed at London's Barbican Hall by tenor Juan Diego Flórez.  A separate  is also available for viewing.

In 2013, "Huiracocha" was recorded by Ward De Vleeschhouwer on the album Chicha Morada in a version for piano solo.

Her lyrical Spanish translation of "The Star-Spangled Banner" is on display in The Star-Spangled Banner exhibit at the National Museum of American History in Washington, D.C.
 
An exhibit with a display of her cultural achievements in the arts and writings opened at the Albert H. Small Documents Gallery September 27, 2012, and was on display until April 2013.

On October 30, 2020, the National Museum of American History in Washington, D.C. posted a tribute to Arias on their Instagram account @amhistorymuseum.7

List of works

See also

 List of 20th-century American women composers

References 

1901 births
1959 deaths
People from Iquitos
People from Manhattan
Writers from Brooklyn
Musicians from Brooklyn
Songwriters from New York (state)
20th-century American composers
20th-century American translators
20th-century American women writers
20th-century American women musicians
20th-century American musicians
20th-century women composers
Advertising in the United States
American women composers
American lyricists
Peruvian composers
Peruvian emigrants to the United States
Peruvian translators
English–Spanish translators
Women in advertising
Jingle composers
Jingle writers